This article covers the religious affiliation in the United States House of Representatives.

While the religious preference of elected officials is by no means an indication of their allegiance nor necessarily reflective of their voting record, the religious affiliation of prominent members of all three branches of government is a source of commentary and discussion among the media and public. The topic is also of interest to religious groups and the general public who may appeal to Representatives of their denomination on religious or moral issues facing the United States House of Representatives.

Current United States representatives 
The following list reports the religious affiliation of the members of the United States House of Representatives in the 118th Congress. In most cases, besides specific sources, the current Representatives' religious affiliations are those mentioned in regular researches by the Pew Forum on Religion and Public Life at the Pew Research Center.

Christians (385; 166 Democrats, 219 Republicans)

Protestants (248; 96 Democrats, 152 Republicans)

Unspecified Protestants (89; 27 Democrats, 62 Republicans)

Baptists (61; 24 Democrats, 37 Republicans)

Methodists (27; 16 Democrats, 11 Republicans)

Presbyterians (17; 8 Democrats, 9 Republicans)

Episcopalians (16; 7 Democrats, 9 Republicans)

Lutherans (16; 7 Democrats, 9 Republicans)

Non-denominational Protestants (12; 3 Democrats, 9 Republicans)

Restorationist (4; 4 Republicans)

Reformed (2; 1 Democrat, 1 Republican)

Adventists (2; 2 Democrats)

Pentecostals (1; 1 Republican)

Congregationalists (1; 1 Republican)

Catholics (122; 66 Democrats, 56 Republicans)

Eastern Catholics (1; 1 Democrat)

Roman Catholics (121; 65 Democrats, 56 Republicans)

Eastern Orthodox Christians (8; 4 Democrats, 4 Republicans)

Antiochian Orthodox (1; 1 Republican)

Greek Orthodox (5; 2 Republicans; 3 Democrats)

Russian Orthodox (1; 1 Democrat)

Unspecified Orthodox (1; 1 Republican)

The Church of Jesus Christ of Latter-day Saints (6; 6 Republicans)

Messianic Jewish (1; 1 Republican)

Jewish (25; 23 Democrats, 2 Republicans)

Muslims (3; 3 Democrats)

Sunni Muslims (2; 2 Democrats)

Unspecified Muslims (1; 1 Democrat)

Unitarian Universalists (3; 3 Democrats)

Hindus (2; 2 Democrats)

Buddhist (1; 1 Democrat)

Unknown/refused to state (14; 13 Democrats, 1 Republican)

Unaffiliated (1; 1 Democrat)

Numbers and percentages 
The most basic breakdown of the above data in this page indicates that 89% of the House identify as Christian, 6% of the House identify as Jewish, 2% of the House identify with other religions, <1% of the House is unaffiliated, and 3% percent of the House don't know or refused to state their affiliation.

See also 
 Religion in the United States
 Demographics of the United States
 Chaplain of the United States Senate
 Chaplain of the United States House of Representatives
 Religious affiliation in the United States Senate
 Religious affiliations of presidents of the United States
 Religious affiliations of vice presidents of the United States

References

External links 
 

History of religion in the United States
Lists of members of the United States House of Representatives
United States House
United States House of Representatives
US House